The Revolution is the second studio album from Christian alternative rock band Inhabited. It was released on July 12, 2005 on Fervent Records. Four songs were released as radio singles: "Open My Eyes", "One More Night", "Revolution" and "Rescue Me", which charted in the top 10 on Christian rock radio and top 20 on Christian music charts. "Rescue Me" is on the Digital Praise PC game Guitar Praise.

Track listing
"Open My Eyes" – 3:25
"Rescue Me" – 3:24
"Everybody Listen" – 2:49
"One More Night" – 4:53
"I Run to You" – 3:33
"You Are My Peace" – 3:54
"Save My Life" – 4:33
"Angel (Where Are You)" – 4:23
"If We Could Love" – 3:23
"Memories" – 4:20
"Revolution" – 3:30

References

2005 albums
Inhabited (band) albums
Fervent Records albums